Eswaran Thangavel (born 20 September 1986) is an Indian cinematographer and producer and actor known for his works in  Tamil, Malayalam and Telegu Cinema and has to date completed 3 feature films and 4 short films.

Career 

Eswaran Thangavel, a cinematographer from south India, graduated from DG Vaishnav College in BSc Visual Communication and later pursued a Diploma in Television and Film Technology from M.G.R. Government Film and Television Training Institute

He won the award  the best cinematographer at Jaipur International film festival 2017 for Kerala Pardiso.

Filmography

References

External links 
 Official website
 
 Take Diversion movie

Living people
Tamil film cinematographers
Malayalam film cinematographers
21st-century Indian photographers
Male actors in Tamil cinema
M.G.R. Government Film and Television Training Institute alumni
1986 births